Alphonse Ilunga or Ilunga Dibwe Luakamanyabo (born 25 December 1931) is a Congolese politician.

Biography 
Alphonse Ilunga was born on 25 December 1931 in Tshikapa, Kasai, Belgian Congo into the Katawa clan of the Lulua. He later worked as a clerk for the Kasai Brewery. In 1958 he was elected to the Ndesha communal council and then subsequently appointed to the Luluabourg city council. His familial relations to the customary chief Kalamba Mangole contributed to his political success. He participated in the Belgo-Congolese Round Table Conference from January to February 1960 as a delegate for the Parti National du Progrès.

Ilunga served as the first Congolese Minister of Public Works under Prime Minister Patrice Lumumba. Following the dismissal of the Lumumba Government in September, he was made Minister of Art, Culture, and Sports under Joseph Iléo. In February 1961 he returned to his position as Minister of Public Works. Ilunga retained the office under Prime Minister Cyrille Adoula until July 1962 when Adoula reshuffled his government and made him Minister of Communications and Transport. In June 1964 he was elected to the steering committee of the press and propaganda arm of the Rassemblement des démocrates congolaise (RADECO). His service in the government ended on 9 July. In 1965 he was elected to the Senate. Following Joseph-Désiré Mobutu's seizure of power later that year, Ilunga was able to retain government positions due to the influence of Kalamba and his uncle Bakole wa Ilunga, Archbishop of Kananga. He reprised his role as Minister of Public Works on 16 August 1968, serving until 31 July 1969. In 1970 he was elected to the National Assembly.

Citations

References 

 
 
 
 
 

1931 births
Living people
People of the Congo Crisis
Government ministers of the Democratic Republic of the Congo
Lumumba Government members
Members of the Senate (Democratic Republic of the Congo)
21st-century Democratic Republic of the Congo people